is a 1956 black-and-white Japanese film directed by Masaki Mori. It is a Japanese horror film based on the Japanese ghost story (kaidan) about Oiwa and Tamiya Iemon.

Cast 
 Tomisaburo Wakayama as Iemon (Tamiya Iemon)
 (相馬千恵子) as Oiwa
 Chouko Iida (飯田蝶子)
 Shigeru Ogura
 Haruo Tanaka

See also 
 Film adaptations of the Yotsuya Kaidan story

References

External links 
 

Japanese black-and-white films
Japanese horror films
1956 films
1956 horror films
1950s Japanese films